Ian Ronald Johnston  (born 1943) is an Australian human factors engineer and road safety advocate. He is a fellow of the Australian Academy of Technological Sciences and Engineering.

Johnston was educated at the University of Melbourne. In 1991, he was appointed professor and director of the Monash University Accident Research Centre (MUARC) - the largest accident research centre in the Southern Hemisphere. Upon his retirement, he was praised by senior university and government figures as extremely influential in reducing road injuries in Victoria and worldwide. Johnston was appointed a Member of the Order of Australia in 2007 for service to the transport industry, particularly the promotion of road safety.

Prior to assuming his role at the MUARC, Johnston held a number of positions, including Director of Road Safety for the Government of Victoria under the John Cain II government.

Works

References

1949 births
Living people
Academic staff of Monash University
Engineers from Melbourne
Members of the Order of Australia